is a Japanese judoka.

He was born in Ōkawa, Kagawa.

He won a gold medal at the -71 kg category of the Universiade in 1985 and Paris Super World Cup in 1986.

After graduating from Tsukuba University in 1991, he belonged to Tsukuba-Keikaku. In 1995, he took office as the coach of the judo club at Toin University of Yokohama.

References

1964 births
Living people
Japanese male judoka
Sportspeople from Kagawa Prefecture
Asian Games medalists in judo
Judoka at the 1986 Asian Games
Asian Games silver medalists for Japan
Medalists at the 1986 Asian Games
Universiade medalists in judo
Goodwill Games medalists in judo
Universiade gold medalists for Japan
Medalists at the 1985 Summer Universiade
Competitors at the 1990 Goodwill Games
20th-century Japanese people
21st-century Japanese people